KWHK is a radio station airing a classic hits format licensed to Hutchinson, Kansas, broadcasting on 95.9 MHz FM.  The station is formerly an oldies format station, and was owned by Ad Astra Per Aspera Broadcasting, Inc.

References

External links
KWHK's official website

Classic hits radio stations in the United States
WHK